Rosa prattii is a wild rose species native to China, with pink flowers.

References

prattii
Flora of China